The Bologna School is "a system of interpretation of the [Vatican II] council which emphasized the 'spirit' of the council, styling the progressive reformers as the heroes and the conservative minority at the council as the enemies of progress". It is name after the city of Bologna, the intellectual centre of this school of thought. 

The leading minds of this historical school have been  Giuseppe Dossetti, Alberto Melloni and Giuseppe Alberigo.

See also 
 Fondazione per le Scienze Religiose Giovanni XXIII
 Pact of the Catacombs
 Saint Gallen Group

References

Further reading

Second Vatican Council
20th-century Catholicism